Robert Brinkley Gandy (August 25, 1893 – June 19, 1945) was a Major League Baseball center fielder. Gandy stood at 6'3 180 lbs (which was considered tall for his time), earning him the nickname "String", for his more than average size.  Gandy played in one game for the Philadelphia Phillies on October 5, . He had two at-bats and went 0-2.  He shot himself to death in Jacksonville in 1945.

References

External links 

1893 births
1945 suicides
Philadelphia Phillies players
Major League Baseball center fielders
Baseball players from Jacksonville, Florida
Portsmouth Truckers players
Suicides by firearm in Florida